Nicolas Huysman (born 9 February 1968) is a French former professional footballer who played as an attacking midfielder and manager.

Career
Huysman started his career with Dunkerque in 1984 and spent six seasons with the club before transferring to Ligue 1 side Metz. He went on to play for Caen, Le Havre and Créteil before returning to Dunkerque at the end of his career. Huysman was appointed manager of Dunkerque in 2002 and held the position for eight years before being replaced by Ludovic Pollet in March 2010. Following the departure of Pollet in February 2012, Huysman was re-appointed as manager.

Personal life
Huysman is the father of the French footballer Jérémy Huysman.

References

External links

1968 births
Living people
Sportspeople from Dunkirk
French footballers
FC Metz players
Stade Malherbe Caen players
Le Havre AC players
US Créteil-Lusitanos players
Ligue 1 players
French football managers
Association football midfielders
USL Dunkerque managers
Footballers from Hauts-de-France